Double parking refers to parking parallel to a car already parked at the curb or double parking in attended car parks and garages.

Parking parallel to a car already parked at the curb

"Double parking" means standing or parking a vehicle on the roadway side of a vehicle already stopped, standing or parked at the curb. This often prevents some of the vehicles in the first row from departing and always obstructs a traffic lane or bike lane (to the extent of often making the street impassable in one-way single-lane situations). In some areas, people double parking their cars leave the hand brake off, allowing the drivers of the cars next to the curb to push the double parked car a little forward or backward, in order to allow departing from the parking spot.  Double parking in this fashion, where illegal, is often punished by ticketing or towing the offending vehicle.

In some urban areas where parking is extremely hard to obtain, courier and delivery services will instruct their drivers that if necessary they may double park anyway, and if ticketed to simply turn it in at the end of their shift. The practice is so common that Washington, D.C. permits companies to establish a monthly billing account for all of their vehicles that receive any parking tickets.

Double parking in attended car parks and garages
Attended car parks and garages frequently use double parking to maximize vehicle storage density.  A driver who double-parks in an attended car park leaves the vehicle's keys with the attendant.  If the driver of the blocked car returns first, then the attendant can move the blocking car so that the blocked car can leave.  This practice is especially common for valet car parks, in which attendants have the keys to all vehicles.

References

Parking
Traffic law